Otis Earle (born 17 January 1992) is an English professional footballer who plays as a defender.

Career

Youth
Earle attended Epsom College in Surrey before moving to America to study at University of California, Riverside from 2011 to 2014. He also played in the Premier Development League for FC Tucson in 2014.

Professional
On 15 January 2015, Earle was selected in the first round (15th overall) of the 2015 MLS SuperDraft by FC Dallas. He made his professional debut for Dallas in a 4–1 US Open Cup win over Oklahoma City Energy on 16 June 2015. Two days later, he moved on loan to Arizona United. He played six times for Arizona as injuries restricted his game time. He was released by Dallas at the end of the 2015 season. In January 2017, he joined New England Revolution on trial.

Personal life
Earle is the son of the former Port Vale, Wimbledon and Jamaica national team footballer and World Cup goalscorer Robbie Earle. He holds a U.S. green card which qualifies him as a domestic player for MLS roster purposes.

References

External links

1992 births
Living people
English footballers
English sportspeople of Jamaican descent
English expatriate footballers
UC Riverside Highlanders men's soccer players
FC Tucson players
FC Dallas players
Phoenix Rising FC players
Association football defenders
Expatriate soccer players in the United States
FC Dallas draft picks
USL League Two players
USL Championship players
English expatriate sportspeople in the United States